are a 1700 meter high active volcano group in Kagoshima Prefecture and Miyazaki Prefecture, Kyushu, Japan. Numerous eruptions have been recorded since 742. Very strong eruptions happened in 788, 1716 and 1717. Augite-hypersthene andesite is the dominant rock type.

Its name literally means "Korea Peak"; it was once believed to be so high that the Korean Peninsula could be seen from its summit. They are part of Kirishima-Yaku National Park near Kirishima City. Legend via oldest extant texts state the summit of Takachiho was stuck the mysterious spear Ama-no-Sakahoko, by the legendary Ninigi-no-Mikoto. Mount Kirishima is considered one of the 100 Famous Japanese Mountains. The area is often foggy, and it is believed that the name Kirishima comes from the mountain looking like an island in the fog.

The Kongō-class battlecruiser Kirishima of the Imperial Japanese Navy, and the Kongō-class guided missile destroyer Kirishima of the Japan Maritime Self-Defense Force were both named after this mountain.

Shinmoedake is the most active of the Mount Kirishima volcanoes, having erupted in January 2011, March 2011, October 2017, and April 2018.

The region as well as areas downstream is in the path of expanding Meiyu front from the continent, during the East Asian rainy season, potentially unleashing flash flooding and landslides during this time.

See also

 List of volcanoes in Japan

References

External links 

 Kirishimayama - Japan Meteorological Agency 
   - Japan Meteorological Agency
 Kirishima Volcano - Geological Survey of Japan
 
 Kirishima Geopark - The Kirishima Geopark Council
 Volcanoes & Craters
 

Mountains of Kagoshima Prefecture
Volcanoes of Kagoshima Prefecture
VEI-7 volcanoes
Shield volcanoes
Stratovolcanoes of Japan